The Lascurain Aura was a prototype of a regional aircraft designed and built for Mexican engineer Angel Lascurain. It was the largest aircraft designed and built in Mexico.

Development 
Lascurain wanted to manufacture an aircraft designed for the regional airlines of some parts of Mexico that required connecting populations in very rugged geographical areas that had no access to any other type of transport than the aerial and the rugged terrain caused the airstrips to be very short for the American and European aircraft of those times.

Lascurain determined that regional airlines required a twin-engine plane with fixed landing gear that was accessible (since foreign aircraft cost more than one million pesos and airlines could not pay for them), capable of landing at low speed on short runways. The aircraft had to have a high rate of climb to overcome the mountainous areas.

In 1955 Ángel Lascurain went with the architect Juan Cortina Portilla, beginning the design of the aircraft based on the turkey buzzard, a bird for which Lascurain felt fascination.

Design 
The aircraft was a twin-engine monoplane with a mid-wing monocoque fuselage built in duralumin that was capable of holding 12 people in 2 rows of 6 seats plus a bathroom lobby, with the option of 14 seats without the bathroom, all this without counting the two pilots. The fuselage was part of the wings through beams that extended to the ends of the same, this in order to protect passengers and pilots in case of accident. Each wing had between the engine and the fuselage 2 compartments for luggage of 0.65 cubic meters each, the aircraft had 2 tanks of fuel of 200 liters each that fed to the Jacobs R-755 engines by means of gravity and pumps besides 2 tanks auxiliaries located at the ends of the wings of 50 liters each.

Accident 
On December 24, 1957, during a routine flight of the plane Lascurain Aura with license plate XB-ZEU at the Mexico City Airport for no apparent reason, both engines of the aircraft were stopped and the pilot attempted to land at the airport. planning until the runway 13, nevertheless they did not reach to arrive at the track, crashing in a board of earth a few meters before the head of the same one, killing the pilot Carlos Castillo Segura and Angel Lascurain.

Specifications

References

External links 
 Testing the aircraft

Aviation in Mexico
Mexican civil aircraft